is a Japanese virologist famous for his role in discovery of the anti-HIV drug zidovudine (AZT) as well as other anti-AIDS drugs including didanosine (ddI) and zalcitabine (ddC).

Mitsuya was born in Sasebo, Nagasaki and received his M.D. and Ph.D. from Kumamoto University. He joined the American National Cancer Institute in Bethesda, Maryland, in  1982, working initially on Human T-lymphotropic virus 1 before switching his attention to HIV. His identification of AZT as an anti-HIV drug, as well as the anti-HIV properties of didanosine and zalcitabine, was made in 1985. He was appointed Professor of Hematology, Rheumatology and Clinical Immunology at Kumamoto University Graduate School of Medical And Pharmaceutical Sciences.

In December, 2006, he was awarded the first NIH World AIDS Day Award for his work in developing drugs for AIDS. Mitsuya has been chief of the NCI's Experimental Retrovirology Section since 1991.

References and Links
   Page describing Dr. Mitsuya's research on NCI website
  Yarchoan R, Mitsuya H, Broder S. AIDS therapies. Scientific American 1988;259(4):110-9

1950 births
Living people
Japanese virologists
HIV/AIDS researchers
People from Sasebo
Kumamoto University alumni
Academic staff of Kumamoto University